Sonar 2076 is a submarine sonar detection system designed by Thales for the Royal Navy.

The system comprises an integrated suite of active and passive sonar systems including bow, fin, flank and towed arrays. Known components include:
 Type 2077 Parian obstacle avoidance sonar
 Type 2081 environmental monitor
 Type 2094 oceanographic sonar
 Type 2079 active-passive bow sonar
 Type 2078 fire control bow element
 Type 2065 towed array
 Flank array

Support systems include command consoles, upgraded radio communications, upgraded signature reduction, and new flexi couplings to reduce self noise. Sonar 2076 is designed to be fitted into both the new  and the existing , allowing the Royal Navy's entire submarine fleet to have a common sonar system. BAE claims that the 2076 represents a "step change" over previous sonars and is the world's most advanced and effective sonar system. It is said to have 13,000 hydrophones, many times the number fitted in previous Royal Navy systems and more than any other submarine sonar in the world. A key development is the use of high performance and easily upgradeable commercial off-the-shelf (COTS) processing systems, allowing the introduction of much more sophisticated algorithms compared to earlier sonars. The processing power of the system is said to be equivalent to 60,000 home PCs.

Swiftsure and Trafalgar Update manager, Captain Ian Hughes said, "A good analogy for the performance of Sonar 2076 is that if the submarine was in Winchester it would be able to track a double decker bus going round Trafalgar Square" (a distance of about 60 miles).

References 

Sonar 2076
Military sonar equipment of the United Kingdom
United Kingdom defence procurement